Salvation Army Congress Hall may refer to:
 Salvation Army Congress Hall, Perth
 The Salvation Army, Sydney Congress Hall